Jonathan Stark may refer to:

 Jonathan Stark (tennis) (born 1971), American professional tennis player
 Jonathan Stark (actor) (born 1955), American actor and screenwriter
 Jonathan Stark (basketball) (born 1995), American basketball player

See also
Jon Snow (character), fictional character, son of Ned Stark
 John Stark (disambiguation)